General Henry Duncan Graham Crerar  (28 April 1888 – 1 April 1965) was a senior officer of the Canadian Army who became the country's senior field commander in the Second World War as commander of the First Canadian Army in the campaign in North West Europe in 1944–1945.
A graduate of the Royal Military College of Canada, in Kingston, Ontario, Crerar was commissioned as a lieutenant in the Non-Permanent Active Militia in 1909, serving with the 4th Battery, Canadian Field Artillery, which was based in Hamilton, Ontario. He rose to the rank of lieutenant-colonel in the artillery in the First World War, during which he was mentioned in despatches and made a member of the Distinguished Service Order (DSO). Electing to remain in the army as a professional soldier after the war, he attended the Staff College, Camberley, from 1923 to 1924, and the Imperial Defence College in 1934. He was appointed Director of Military Operations & Military Intelligence in 1935 and Commandant of the Royal Military College of Canada in 1939.

During the Second World War he became General Officer Commanding the 2nd Canadian Infantry Division, which was then stationed in England, in 1941. He was promoted to lieutenant-general and assumed command of I Canadian Corps, fighting briefly in the Italian Campaign. In March 1944 he returned to the United Kingdom where he assumed command of the First Canadian Army which, although designated the Canadian First Army, contained a significant amount of British and Polish troops, including the British I Corps and the Polish 1st Armoured Division. Under Crerar's command, the First Canadian Army fought in the latter stages of the Battle of Normandy in July−August 1944, participating in Operation Totalize, Operation Tractable and the Battle of the Falaise Pocket, before being tasked with clearing the Channel Coast. Crerar was promoted to full general on 16 November 1944, becoming the first Canadian officer to hold that rank in the field. During Operation Veritable, the battle for the Rhineland in 1945, the First Canadian Army controlled nine British divisions. The Army became more Canadian with Operation Goldflake, the redeployment of the I Canadian Corps from Italy, and played a key role in the liberation of the western Netherlands in April 1945, shortly before the end of World War II in Europe.

With the war over, Crerar retired from military service in 1946 and, despite his many achievements, soon faded into relative obscurity until his death in 1965. J. L. Granatstein wrote of Crerar that: "No other single officer had such impact on the raising, fighting, and eventual disbanding of the greatest army Canada has ever known. Crerar was unquestionably the most important Canadian soldier of the war."

Early years
Henry Duncan Graham "Harry" Crerar was born in Hamilton, Ontario, on 28 April 1888, the eldest child of Peter Crerar, a lawyer and businessman, and Marion Stinson Crerar. He had three younger siblings, Alistair, Violet and Malcolm, and an older half-sister, Lillian, from his mother's first marriage. His early education was in private schools in Hamilton. In 1899, he went to Upper Canada College, a boarding school in Toronto. He spent a year in Switzerland in 1904, then went to Highfield College in Hamilton to prepare for the Royal Military College of Canada in Kingston, Ontario. Highfield College had an Army cadet unit of which he was a member. 

Crerar was one of 35 cadets who entered the Royal Military College of Canada in August 1906. This involved passing completive examinations (which had a 33 per cent passing grade), and obtaining certificates from the minister of Christ's Church Cathedral in Hamilton and the headmaster of Highfield College testifying to his high moral character. He graduated in 1909, ranked thirteenth in his class. He  hoped to secure a place with a cavalry regiment of the British Army or British Indian Army, but only seven places were available in the British or Indian armies, of which just two were in the cavalry, and he did not rank high enough. Cost was also a factor; service in a British cavalry regiment was expensive and he would have had to rely on his father topping up his income. Instead, he accepted a commission as a lieutenant in the Non-Permanent Active Militia, serving with the 4th Battery, Canadian Field Artillery, which was based in Hamilton.

Crerar took a job as a superintendent with the Canadian Tungsten Lamp Company. In 1912 he went to Vienna to study the manufacture of incandescent light bulbs. The death of his father in 1912 prompted a career change and a move to Toronto, where he joined his brother-in-law Adam Beck as an engineer with the Hydro-Electric Power Commission of Ontario. The two men travelled around Canada promoting the benefits of hydroelectricity, and he visited Europe in 1913 to observe the progress of electricity grids there. He courted Marion Verschoyle Cronyn, who was always known as Verse. She was the great-granddaughter of Benjamin Cronyn, and the daughter of Benjamin Barton Cronyn, a prominent Toronto businessman.

First World War
On the outbreak of the First World War in August 1914, the 4th Battery was one of nine Militia batteries called up as units to form the artillery of the 1st Canadian Division. The members of the battery all volunteered for overseas service in the Canadian Expeditionary Force (CEF). Crerar was promoted to captain. The 1st Division went into camp at Valcartier, near Quebec City, where the 4th Battery was reorganised with six guns instead of four, and was renumbered the 8th Battery. The table of organisation and equipment of each battery called for 6 officers, 187 other ranks, and 183 horses. Three batteries formed a brigade; the 8th Battery was part of the 3rd Brigade. The battery embarked for the UK on the SS Gambion on 1 October, and reached Plymouth on 14 October.

The 1st Canadian Division went into camp on Salisbury Plain. Training was interrupted in November. Experience in mobile warfare had shown that six-gun batteries were too hard to control, so the British War Office decided to revert to the old four-gun battery organisation. The reorganisation of the Canadian batteries commenced on 17 November, and the 8th Battery was renumbered the 11th Battery. Each brigade should have had three batteries of 18-pounders and one of the 4.5-inch howitzers, but the latter were not yet available. Training was hampered by the weather; it rained on 89 of the 123 days the Canadians spent there, and there was competition for firing ranges from British units. There were also shortages of ammunition, and the batteries did not fire their guns until January 1915, when each fired 55 rounds.

The 1st Canadian Division moved to the Western Front in February 1915. The following month the division artillery participated in the Battle of Neuve Chapelle, where the 1st Canadian Division had a minor role, and in April was engaged in the Second Battle of Ypres, when the 11th Battery came under sustained German artillery fire. Crerar acted as 11th Battery commander from 11 to 22 July, and then assumed command of the 10th Battery. On 7 December he left on furlough to England, and then returned to Canada, where he married Verse at St Paul's Anglican Church in Toronto on 14 January 1916 in a ceremony conducted by Archdeacon H. J. Cody. He spent another month on leave in Canada before the two embarked for the UK, where she worked as a volunteer nurse at a hospital in Kingston upon Thames. She returned to Canada for the birth of their first child, a daughter named Margaret (known as Peggy), in November 1916.

Crerar returned to the 3rd Brigade as adjutant on 22 February. He resumed command of the 11th Battery again on 25 March. It supported the Canadian attacks in the Battle of Flers–Courcelette in September 1916. He attended a gunnery course at Witley Camp in England in February 1917, but returned to lead the 11th Battery in the Battle of Vimy Ridge in March. He was mentioned in despatches and made a member of the Distinguished Service Order in the 1917 Birthday Honours.

In May 1917, Crerar attended a junior staff officer course. In August he became brigade major of the newly formed 5th Canadian Division Artillery, which was training in England, but soon after joined the Canadian Corps on the Western Front. Crerar worked closely with the brigade major of the Canadian Corps Artillery, British Major Alan Brooke, or "Brookie", as he was known from then on to Crerar, "a great fellow", and they would often "tramp the front line of battery positions together." Crerar also worked with the corps counter battery staff officer (CBSO), Lieutenant-Colonel Andrew McNaughton; the two devised techniques for employing the corps's Newton 6-inch mortars in a counter-mortar role.

In June 1918, as part of the ongoing "Canadianisation" of the corps, Brooke was given an appointment on the staff of the British First Army, and was succeeded as Staff Officer, Royal Artillery, (SORA) by Major Don A. White. White was immediately sent on a staff course, and Crerar acted as SORA until he returned. Crerar was thus SORA during the Battle of Amiens in August 1918. In October, McNaughton became the General Officer Commanding (GOC) Canadian Corps Heavy Artillery, and Crerar succeeded him as the CBSO, a position he held during the Battle of Valenciennes in November 1918. That month saw the war come to an end due to the Armistice with Germany.

Although Crerar had survived the war intact, his two younger brothers were not so fortunate: his youngest brother, Malcolm Charlton Crerar, was killed in action, aged 19, on 3 August 1917 while serving with the British Royal Air Force (RAF), and his other brother, Alistair John Crerar, was badly wounded in France in 1918 while serving with the Royal Canadian Dragoons. By then Crerar was

Between the wars
With the war over, Crerar returned to Canada, where his CEF appointment was terminated on 24 March 1919. His mother died in May 1919, leaving annuities for her surviving children. Financially secure, Crerar decided to join the Permanent Active Militia, Canada's full-time professional force. He wrote to the Deputy Inspector General of Artillery (DIGA), Major-General Sir Edward Morrison, to apply for a position on the DIGA staff. Crerar was accepted, and in March 1920 he was commissioned as a major in the Royal Canadian Artillery.  A second child, a boy named Peter, was born in July 1922.

Crerar set his sights on attending the British Staff College, Camberley, where two positions were set aside for Canadian officers each year. He completed a four-month preparatory course at the Royal Military College, passed the Camberley entrance examinations in 1922, and secured admission in January 1923. At the time the college commandant was Major-General Edmund Ironside, and the college staff included Lieutenant-Colonels Ronald Adam, Alan Brooke and J. F. C. Fuller. Normally staff college would be followed by a staff appointment in Canada, but the death of the Canadian representative at the War Office led to Crerar being given a two-year posting as a General Staff Officer, 2nd Grade (GSO2), in the office of the Director of Military Operations and Intelligence (DMO&I), who was Lieutenant-Colonel Archibald Wavell at the time. In this role he helped coordinate the British Army's response to the 1926 United Kingdom general strike. Crerar concurrently served as the Canadian representative at the War Office.

On returning to Canada in April 1927, Crerar was appointed to command B Battery, Royal Canadian Horse Artillery. His subalterns included a recent Royal Military College graduate, Lieutenant Guy Simonds. In January 1928, Crerar became Professor of Tactics at the Royal Military College. Then, in May 1929, he was suddenly called to National Defence Headquarters (NDHQ) in Ottawa to serve on the General Staff at the behest of McNaughton, who was appointed the Chief of the General Staff (CGS), the head of the Canadian Army, in January 1929. He joined that staff of the Canadian DMO&I, Colonel Harold Matthews, as General Staff Officer, 1st Grade (GSO1).

After the death of thir newborn third child in May 1933, Verse took Peter and went to England to join Peggy, who was at boarding school there. Crerar had McNaughton and Matthews nominate him to attend the Imperial Defence College in London in 1934 so the family could be reunited. He was the eleventh Canadian officer to attend since its founding in 1927. While there, he again encountered his friend Brooke, who was now an instructor at the college. Crerar performed well, with his assessment stating that he possessed "outstanding ability", with "all the attributes for high command." He returned to Ottawa in 1935 as DMO&I, an extremely important post, the senior staff planner for the army. Then in August 1938, he became the commandant of the Royal Military College, and with it came the temporary rank of brigadier, although he was disappointed at not being the first choice of the CGS, Major General Ernest Charles Ashton.

Second World War

Canadian Military Headquarters and Chief of the General Staff
With the Canadian declaration of war on Germany on 10 September 1939, Canada entered the Second World War. Crerar expected a Canadian contribution to the war on land akin to that of the First World War, but the Prime Minister, Mackenzie King, hoped that an industrial effort and participation in the British Commonwealth Air Training Plan would suffice. On 19 September, the government announced that it would send one division, the 1st under McNaughton, to the UK.

Crerar was appointed Brigadier, General Staff, (BGS) of what was initially called "Overseas Headquarters", but was soon renamed Canadian Military Headquarters (CMHQ), in London. He established CMHQ on the second floor of the Sun Life Building, not far from Canada House on Trafalgar Square. CMHQ expanded from 87 personnel in December 1939 to over 900 a year later. The legal basis of the Canadian presence in the UK had changed with the 1931 Statute of Westminster which made Canada a sovereign nation in its own right, and was now governed by the 1933 Visiting Forces Act, which provided the legal basis for Canadian forces serving under British command. Crerar was promoted to acting major general on 15 January 1940. He hoped to be given command of the 2nd Canadian Division when it was formed, but that went instead to Colonel Victor Odlum.

The Battle of France injected some urgency into the Canadian war effort, and on 17 May 1940 the government finally announced the decision to form a Canadian corps. In the meantime, the Canadian troops in the UK formed part of the British VII Corps, which was placed under McNaughton's command. This was renamed the Canadian Corps on 25 December after sufficient Canadian corps troops had arrived. The Minister of National Defence, Norman Rogers, was killed in a plane crash on 10 June 1940, and was replaced by James Ralston. On McNaughton's advice, Ralston recalled Crerar to Ottawa to serve as the Vice Chief of the General Staff (VCGS). Crerar expected that he would soon be asked to take over as CGS. This occurred the following month, just two days after he arrived back in Canada. He brought Colonel E. L. M. Burns from the 2nd Division staff as his DMO&I, and Brigadier Kenneth Stuart, who had succeeded him as commandant of the Royal Military College, as his VCGS.

Having achieved his objective of creating a Canadian corps, Crerar set his sights on creating an army of two corps, each of which would have two infantry divisions and an armoured division. This would be a larger force than the country could sustain with volunteers alone, and would therefore involve sending conscripts overseas, something King opposed. In Crerar's view, that was the politicians' problem. Although the proposed army headquarters did not make it into Crerar's revised army program for 1942 that was submitted to Cabinet War Committee in November 1941, Ralston expressed his support. It was ultimately scaled back to five divisions and two independent armoured brigades, due to shortages of manpower.

More controversial was Crerar's role in the government's decision to provide Canadian troops to reinforce the garrison of Hong Kong. This arose following a visit from the outgoing commander of the garrison, Major General Arthur Edward Grasett. Although a British Army officer, he was a Canadian and a Royal Military College classmate of Crerar's. The British believed that the chance of Japan going to war was remote, and that a show of resolve would reassure China and help deter Japanese aggression. The Canadians were totally dependent on the British assessment of the situation, as there was no Canadian intelligence organisation that could provide an independent evaluation. Crerar had studied the defence of Hong Kong while at the Imperial Defence College in 1934, but he believed that a war with the British Empire and the United States would be disastrous for Japan, embroiling it in a war it could not win.

Rather than take troops from the UK or the 4th Canadian Division, which was forming in Canada, Crerar chose to send the Winnipeg Grenadiers and the Royal Rifles of Canada, which had been on garrison duty in Jamaica and Newfoundland. In December, the Japanese did attack, and the two battalions were engulfed in the Battle of Hong Kong. About 300 Canadians were killed in the fighting, and the rest became prisoners of the Japanese. A Royal Commission was convened to inquire into the disaster, but by this time Crerar had moved on, and he escaped censure. Others at NDHQ were less fortunate and were sacked.

Corps commander
It came as a surprise to many, even some that knew him well, that Crerar still yearned for a field command. A vacancy occurred at the 2nd Infantry Division through Odlum's forced retirement, and Ralston was happy to replace Crerar with Stuart, whom he found much easier to work with. Crerar's appointment was announced on 19 November 1941. That day, Ralston had the position of CGS upgraded to lieutenant-general, something Crerar had long advocated. Division command would mean dropping down to major-general once more, but his seniority would remain. In the event, Crerar never assumed command of the 2nd Infantry Division. On arrival in the UK he replaced Major-General George Pearkes as acting commander of the Canadian Corps in the absence of McNaughton, who was on extended medical leave, and so remained a lieutenant-general.

The First Canadian Army was formed on 6 April 1942 under McNaughton's command, and Crerar therefore remained in command of the corps, which now became the I Canadian Corps, although the II Canadian Corps was not formed until 14 January 1943. For a BGS, Crerar had Guy Simonds, although not for long, as Simonds was appointed to command the 2nd Canadian Division, before transferring to command the 1st Canadian Division on 29 April 1943, after its commander, Major-General H. L. N. Salmon, was killed in a plane crash. He was replaced as BGS of I Canadian Corps by Brigadier Churchill Mann. In January 1943, Crerar was created a Companion of the Order of the Bath, the highest level of award permitted by Canadian government policy.

The corps formed part of South-Eastern Command, under Lieutenant-General Bernard Montgomery. Crerar and Montgomery instituted a vigorous training program. Exercise Spartan in March 1943, was a major training exercise that involved over 250,000 troops and over 72,000 vehicles. Crerar's handling of the I Canadian Corps during the exercise drew praise from McNaughton, General Sir Bernard Paget, the Commander-in-Chief, Home Forces, and Brooke, who was now a knight, a general and the Chief of the Imperial General Staff (CIGS). Paget and Brooke, however, were unimpressed with McNaughton's performance in the exercise, and Brooke in particular became an advocate for McNaughton's removal. Without operational experience to draw on, Canadian officers were judged on technical and staff education. This tended to favour Royal Military College-educated engineers and gunners. Crerar showed tact and restraint in the relief of officers who did not meet his standards, and often suggested alternative postings where they could perform good service in a Canadian Army that was still desperately short of trained officers.

Crerar suggested that Canadian troops participate in raids on the French coast to gain combat experience. A small raid was conducted French coastal village of Hardelot in April 1942, but the fifty Canadian troops involved did not step ashore. A much larger raid on Dieppe on 19 August involving over 6,000 Allied troops, of whom 4,963 were Canadian, was a disaster; 907 Canadian soldiers were killed died of wounds or died while prisoners of war; 2,460 were wounded; and 1,946 captured, of whom 568 were wounded; only 2,210 returned to the UK at the end of the operation, of whom 586 were wounded. Crerar pressed for his troops to be committed to the North African campaign under Montgomery's command. This was opposed by McNaughton, who wanted the Canadian troops kept together under the command of a Canadian for the upcoming campaign in North West Europe, but by March 1943 it was clear that this would not occur before 1944. On 23 April 1943, Brooke met with McNaughton and presented an alternative proposal to send the 1st Canadian Division to the Mediterranean to take part in Operation Husky, codename for the Allied invasion of Sicily. This was quickly approved by the Canadian government.

Service in Italy
The Canadian government intended that the 1st Canadian Division would return to the UK afterwards, but in the event it remained in the Mediterranean and participated throughout most of the Italian campaign. King then pressed for a second Canadian division to be sent to Italy, along with a corps headquarters. Brooke and McNaughton agreed that this should be the 5th Canadian (Armoured) Division, as sending a second infantry division would leave an unbalanced force of two armoured and one infantry division in the UK. In vain, Montgomery protested that he did not need another corps headquarters, nor an armoured division; the terrain in Italy was not suitable for the employment of armour. He suggested that Crerar gain experience commanding the 1st Canadian Division, a development Crerar would have welcomed, but was not to be. Simonds fell ill with jaundice in September 1943, and was replaced by Christopher Vokes. When he recovered, McNaughton gave him command of the 5th Canadian (Armoured) Division.

Simonds mistakenly blamed Crerar for this transfer, but it was because McNaughton and Montgomery thought would be good preparation for elevation to command of a corps. Crerar and Simonds came into conflict over Simonds's sacking of his divisional artillery commander, Brigadier R. O. G. Morton. Crerar was concerned that the strain of the fighting in Sicily and Italy was telling on Simonds, and he sought a psychiatric assessment. Crerar cautioned Simonds that he was approaching a level of command where balance was as important as brilliance, and that the firing of brigadiers was a matter of concern for the Canadian government. Simonds offered to resign if Crerar had lost confidence in him, but he had not; on 6 January 1944 Crerar recommended Simonds for command of II Canadian Corps in the UK. Crerar's I Canadian Corps became operational in Italy, replacing the British V Corps in the line on 1 February 1944, but no major operations were conducted before Crerar was recalled to the UK on 3 March. On Crerar's recommendation, he was succeeded by "Tommy" Burns as GOC of I Canadian Corps.

Although Crerar had not seen as much action in Italy as he had liked, he had seen enough to write to his sister on 9 February 1944 that, "The weather has been pretty frightful at times", and that, "The fighting has been tough also. The early sensational advances have given place to battle conditions which are so reminiscent of the last war that, to me, they are far from funny."

Army commander

Preparation for Operation Overlord
Ralston and Stuart had long held doubts about McNaughton's capacity to command an army in combat operations, which they conveyed to King at the First Quebec Conference in September 1943, where the future employment of the First Canadian Army was settled. King also spoke to Brooke, who confirmed British reservations about McNaughton. Ralston and Stuart were determined that the First Canadian Army should be led by a Canadian officer, which considerably narrowed the list of suitable candidates. Agreement was reached in November that Crerar would ultimately be appointed, but he would be kept in Italy for a while to gain experience. In the interim, Stuart would be in command. Crerar assumed command of the First Canadian Army on 20 March 1944. Mann was appointed its chief of staff on 28 January 1944; Brigadier Alfred Ernest Walford was the Deputy Adjutant and Quartermaster General (DA&QMG), the chief administrative officer; and Colonel George Edwin (Ted) Beament, like Simonds a Kingston graduate who had served with Crerar in B Battery, was the colonel (general staff). Lieutenant-Colonel Peter Wright was GSO1 (Intelligence) and Lieutenant-Colonel C. Archibald the GSO1 (Operations). Brigadier A. T. MacLean was chief engineer, but was replaced by Brigadier Geoffrey Walsh in September. There were also several British officers, as the First Canadian Army would include a large British component.

Normandy

Crerar's First Canadian Army became operational in Normandy at noon on 23 July, almost seven weeks after the initial Normandy landings, when it assumed responsibility for the eastern part of Montgomery's 21st Army Group's line, which was held by Lieutenant-General John Crocker's British I Corps. In a letter to Brooke, Montgomery noted that Crerar "made his first mistake at 1205 hrs, and his second after lunch." Crerar immediately clashed with Crocker, a highly experienced and competent commander, requiring Montgomery's intervention. Crerar suggested that he be given Lieutenant-General Gerard Bucknall's British XXX Corps or Lieutenant-General Neil Ritchie's British XII Corps instead; "Gerry" Bucknall had been his GSO2 at Kingston, and Ritchie was a colleague when Crerar had worked at the War Office in the 1920s, and he was confident that he could work with them. Montgomery was unwilling to reorganise his forces just to accommodate this. British I Corps would remain part of the First Canadian Army until March 1945, and, despite the rocky start, Crerar and Crocker would build a good working relationship. Simonds's II Canadian Corps came under Crerar's command at noon on 31 July, and the Polish 1st Armoured Division, commanded by Major-General Stanisław Maczek, was assigned to II Canadian Corps on 5 August, making the First Canadian Army a truly multinational force.

First Canadian Army HQ consisted of Main HQ and Rear HQ. The former contained the operational staff while the latter was primarily administrative. When possible, Main HQ would be co-located with that of Air Vice-Marshal Leslie (Bingo) Brown's No. 84 Group RAF, and Beament worked closely with his opposite number on Brown's staff, Group Captain Frederick Rosier. Brown was replaced by Air Vice-Marshal Edmund Hudleston on 10 November 1944. Crerar's day normally commenced with being awakened by his batman, who served him a cup of tea. His aide-de-camp, Lieutenant Finlay Morrison, would brief him at 06:30, and he would meet with his senior staff officers, Mann, Beament, Walford and the GSO1s for intelligence, air and operations. Crerar would do his paperwork in the morning, and he would then visit his corps commanders, accompanied by his other aide, Lieutenant Giles Perodeau. He did not use Mann as his representative like Montgomery used his chief of staff, Major-General Sir Francis de Guingand.

Major operations conducted by First Canadian Army in the Battle of Normandy were Operation Totalize on 7 August and Operation Tractable a week later. In the earlier fighting in Normandy, Crocker and the commander of the British Second Army, Lieutenant-General Miles Dempsey had expressed doubts about the physical and mental fitness of the commander of the 3rd Canadian Infantry Division, Major-General Rod Keller. Crerar was disappointed, as he was considering Keller as a replacement for Burns in Italy. Montgomery responded by moving the 3rd Canadian Infantry Division to Simonds's II Canadian Corps, so Canadian officers could take action. Simonds spoke to Keller, and agreed with Dempsey's assessment, but took no action. Keller was seriously wounded by American bombers on 8 August, and was succeeded by Major-General Daniel Spry ten days later. However, the performance of the 4th Canadian (Armoured) Division in Operation Totalize led to Simonds's relief of its commander, Major-General George Kitching. "If it's any comfort to you," Crerar told Kitching, "it may not be long before Montgomery tries to remove me!"

After the Allied breakout from Normandy, the First Canadian Army was clearing the Channel Coast. The brutal fighting in Normandy had left the First Canadian Army short of men. In the confined terrain, the infantry accounted for 76 per cent of all casualties instead of 48 per cent as forecast by the War Office. The 2nd Canadian Infantry Division alone was 1,900 infantry short by 26 August. Particularly acute was a shortage of French-speaking reinforcements for Les Fusiliers Mont-Royal and Le Régiment de Maisonneuve. CMHQ retrained reinforcement for other branches as infantry, and wounded men were returned from hospital as quickly as possible. Despite these expedients, by 31 August, the First Canadian Army was 4,318 men short. Crerar resisted suggestions that training time for reinforcements be cut. Nor was the problem confined to Canadian troops; on 17 August Crerar received a reminder from the Polish Commander-in-Chief, General Kazimierz Sosnkowski that the Polish forces were having difficulty in obtaining reinforcements.

A  row erupted between Montgomery and Crerar after Crerar chose to attend a commemoration at Dieppe on 3 September instead of a briefing on Operation Market Garden that was attended by senior British and American commanders. When Montgomery threatened to have Crerar replaced, Crerar replied that as the national commander he would take the matter up with the Canadian government. Montgomery immediately backed off; while he might have been successful in removing Crerar, he might also have been removed himself, and his claim to be Allied ground forces commander would have been discredited.

Crerar was featured on the 18 September 1944 cover of Time magazine. By this time, he was suffering from severe abdominal pain. An attack of dysentery on 19 September compelled him to seek medical advice. The doctors diagnosed anaemia, and 25 October ordered him to undergo further diagnosis and treatment in the UK. Crerar conferred with Montgomery, who accepted his recommendation that Simonds became acting commander of the First Canadian Army. Montgomery may have hoped that Crerar would not recover, but when he did, Montgomery persuaded Brooke to delay his return to 7 November, so there would not be a change of army leadership in the midst of the Battle of the Scheldt.

Crerar had to deal with the problem of Burns's continued command of I Canadian Corps. While he was prepared to discount the opinions of British officers like Field Marshall Sir Harold Alexander, the commander of the 15th Army Group, and Lieutenant-General Sir Richard McCreery of the British Eighth Army, Brigadier Ernest Weeks reported that neither Chris Vokes of the 1st Canadian Infantry Division nor Bert Hoffmeister of the 5th Canadian (Armoured) Division had confidence in Burns. On 16 November Burns was replaced by Major-General Charles Foulkes, who had been acting commander of II Canadian Corps while Simonds commanded the First Canadian Army, and before that had commanded the 2nd Canadian Infantry Division. Since Vokes disliked Foulkes, he swapped places with Harry Foster of the 4th Canadian (Armoured) Division. Despite Montgomery's objections, Crerar was promoted to full general on 16 November 1944, becoming the first Canadian officer to hold that rank in the field.

For the Battle of the Reichswald Forest in early 1945, codenamed Operation Veritable, the First Canadian Army was reinforced with the six divisions of Lieutenant-General Brian Horrocks's British XXX Corps. The First Canadian Army now included nine British divisions, and had a strength of over 400,000 personnel, which made it larger than that of Montgomery's Eighth Army at the Second Battle of El Alamein. Despite casualties in the Battle of the Scheldt, the infantry battalions were up to full strength, thanks to the quiet period from November through January, the success of the retraining program, and the arrival of National Resources Mobilization Act (NRMA) conscripts, derogatorily known as "zombies". Veritable was fought in difficult conditions and the Germans, as ever, fought with determination and breached the Roer River dams, turning the battlefield into a quagmire reminiscent to some of the worst battlefields of the First World War. Historian Bill McAndrew described it as "the epitome of the Canadian way of war: large scale orderly preparation, accumulation of massive resources, and meticulous planning. It was another Vimy Ridge." Horrocks wrote that:

Although it meant putting himself in danger, Crerar, "knowing he was sending men to their deaths, did not hesitate to expose himself to enemy fire." Jack Granatstein described Operation Veritable as "Crerar's finest hour".  The operation was ultimately successful but at the cost of over 15,000 casualties to Crerar's First Army; German casualties were estimated at 75,000. General Dwight D. Eisenhower, the Supreme Allied Commander on the Western Front, wrote in a letter to Crerar, stating, "Probably no assault in this war has been conducted in more appalling conditions of terrain than was that one."

In the last two months of the war in Europe, Crerar's First Canadian Army became more Canadian than ever with Operation Goldflake, the redeployment of I Canadian Corps from Italy, and played a key role in the liberation of the western Netherlands in April 1945. On Victory in Europe Day (VE Day) Crerar wrote to the troops under his command, stating, "The business we Canadians came over here to do is virtually finished."

In recognition of Crerar's services in North West Europe, Montgomery recommended that Crerar be made a Knight Commander of the Order of the British Empire, but Canadian government policy forbade the acceptance of knighthoods. The British government responded by appointing him a Companion of Honour on 3 July 1945. He was invested with the award by King George VI. The United States awarded him the Legion of Merit, which was presented by General of the Army Dwight D. Eisenhower, and the Army Distinguished Service Medal, which was presented by the President of the United States, Harry S. Truman. The Netherlands gave him the Grand Cross of the Order of Orange Nassau with Swords, which was presented by Prince Bernhard. Poland gave him the Order of Virtuti Militari; Czechoslovakia awarded him the Order of the White Lion and the Czechoslovak War Cross 1939–1945; Belgium made him a Grand Officer of the Order of Leopold and awarded him the Croix de Guerre 1940 with Palm; and France made him a member of the Legion of Honour and awarded him the Croix de Guerre 1939–1945 with palm. He also received the Canadian Forces Decoration, and was mentioned in despatches four more times.

Post-war

A farewell sign posted on behalf of Crerar to troops of the First Canadian Army departing from the Netherlands in 1945 read: 

Crerar handed over command of the remaining Canadian forces in the Netherlands to Simonds on 21 July. Asked for a recommendation for a post-war Chief of the General Staff, Crerar chose Foulkes. While acknowledging Simonds's brilliance on the battlefield, he considered Foulkes to be more stable. Crerar arrived in Halifax on the troopship , with 980 Canadian World War II veterans on 5 August 1945. Verse and Peggy came on board to greet him. He received the keys to the city, then returned to Ottawa two days later, where he was met by a guard of honour at Union Station. There was a parade down Elgin and Wellington Streets, and dignitaries including the prime minister gave speeches. He spent a day there before heading to Loon Island where his sister lived. He commenced retirement leave on 31 March 1946, and officially retired from the army on 27 October.

In retirement he accepted positions on the boards of several companies, including Barclays bank, the Cockshutt Plow Company and the Guarantee Company of North America. He served on a series of minor diplomatic missions to Czechoslovakia, the Netherlands and Japan. He was appointed Aide-de-Camp General to the King in 1948, the first Canadian to be accorded this honour, and was an Aide-de-Camp General to Queen Elizabeth II in 1953, attending the her coronation in that role. He was awarded honorary degrees by seven universities, including the University of Oxford, McGill University, the University of Toronto and Queen's University at Kingston, became a Knight of the Order of St John on 30 December 1954, and was sworn into the Queen's Privy Council for Canada on 25 June 1964. The appointment to the Privy Council was announced by the Prime Minister, Lester Pearson, on the 20th anniversary of the D-Day landing in Normandy, and commemorated the role of the Canadian Army in the campaign in North West Europe.

Death 
Crerar died on 1 April 1965, at the age of 76, just weeks from his 77th birthday. He was buried with full military honours in Beechwood Cemetery in Ottawa. McNaughton, Simonds, Foulkes, Walsh, Walford, Matthews, Mann and Wright served as his pall bearers.

Reputation
In The Canadian Encyclopedia Brereton Greenhous described Crerar as an able staff officer, but a mediocre commander, and Jack Granatstein described him as "a consummate bureaucrat, much more adept at winning a war of memoranda than commanding a large army  in action". British historian Stephen Ashley Hart considered that "Crerar was a competent army commander, but not much more than that. He was too concerned with non-operational matters, too inexperienced, too weak a field commander, and too determined to protect Canadian interests to gain Montgomery's confidence." But Marianne Grenier argued that "to say that Crerar was an incompetent leader is to neglect his evolution as a commander and the circumstances of the times." Crerar's biographer, Paul Dickson, described him thus:

Notes

References

External links

Service record of General Harry Crerar
Generals of World War II
Canada's 25 Most Renowned Military Leaders

|-

|-

|-

|-

Canadian generals
1888 births
1965 deaths
Canadian Anglicans
Canadian diplomats
Members of the Order of the Companions of Honour
Members of the King's Privy Council for Canada
Companions of the Order of the Bath
Knights of the Order of St John
Canadian Companions of the Distinguished Service Order
Canadian military personnel of World War I
Canadian Army generals of World War II
People from Hamilton, Ontario
Canadian people of Scottish descent
Upper Canada College alumni
Royal Military College of Canada alumni
Graduates of the Staff College, Camberley
Commandants of the Royal Military College of Canada
Graduates of the Royal College of Defence Studies
Burials at Beechwood Cemetery (Ottawa)
Canadian Expeditionary Force officers
Foreign recipients of the Legion of Merit
Foreign recipients of the Distinguished Service Medal (United States)
Academic staff of the Royal Military College of Canada
Royal Regiment of Canadian Artillery officers
Canadian Militia officers
Commanders of the Canadian Army
Canadian military personnel from Ontario